

Season summary 
Juventus sold Boniek, Paolo Rossi and Tardelli replacing them with Laudrup, Manfredonia and Aldo Serena. Domestic league started off with 8 wins in row, a new record, like the 30 points gained in first 15 games. In December Juventus also won Intercontinental Cup, beating Argentinos Juniors on shoot-out.

Defeated by Barcellona in European Cup side lost against Roma and Fiorentina in league, leaving a hope for giallorossi. Anyway, Juventus did not fail to conquest Scudetto thank to wins over Milan and Lecce that – in previous matchday – had beat Roma giving to Trapattoni's team a free way toward the title.

Squad

Competitions

Serie A

League table

Matches

Coppa Italia

First Round

Eightfinals

European Cup

First round

Second round

Quarter-finals

Intercontinental Cup

Statistics

Team statistics 
Updated to April 27, 1986.

Players statistics 
Appearances and goals in league.

Favero (30/1); S.Tacconi (30/−17); Cabrini (30/2); Platini (30/12); Brio (29/3); Laudrup (29/7); M.Mauro (28/2); Bonini (26/1); Serena (25/11); Scirea (25); Manfredonia (23); G.Pin (21/1); Pioli (14); Pacione (12); M.Briaschi (10/2); N.Caricola (5); I.Bonetti (2).

References

Juventus F.C. seasons
Juventus
1986